Carl David Frost (born November 17, 1952) is an American former professional baseball player and a former Major League Baseball pitcher.  The ,  right-hander was drafted by the Chicago White Sox in the 18th round of the 1974 Major League Baseball draft. During a five-year Major League career, Frost played for the White Sox (1978), California Angels (1978–1981), and Kansas City Royals (1982).

Frost made his MLB debut on September 11, 1977 against the California Angels at Anaheim Stadium.  He turned in a quality start, pitching 6 innings and giving up just two earned runs.  He struck out three, walked none, and received a no decision in the 5–4 White Sox loss.  His first big league win came a week later in another great start against the Angels, this time at Comiskey Park.  He went 7 innings, gave up three runs, and won 7–3.

He was traded along with Brian Downing and Chris Knapp to the Angels for Bobby Bonds, Richard Dotson and Thad Bosley on December 5, 1977. He split time between Salt Lake City (PCL) and the big leagues in 1978, and went 5–4 with a 2.58 earned run average in 11 games (ten starts) for the Angels.  Next year would be even better.

Frost had his biggest year in 1979.  He won 16, lost 10, and led Angel starters in ERA (3.57), winning percentage (.615), and innings pitched (239).  California had an impressive group of starters that year, including Frost, Nolan Ryan, Don Aase, Jim Barr, Chris Knapp, and Frank Tanana. They ultimately won the American League West Division pennant that year with an 88–74 record.

Unfortunately, elbow problems severely limited Frost's effectiveness the remainder of his career. In the next three seasons (two with the Angels and one with the Kansas City Royals) he was a combined 11–22 with a 5.43 ERA.

Career totals for 99 games pitched include a 33–37 record, 84 games started, 16 complete games, 3 shutouts, 1 save, and 7 games finished.  He allowed 251 earned runs in 550 innings pitched, giving him a lifetime ERA of 4.10.

Career highlights include a four-hit, no walk complete game shutout vs. the Oakland A's (July 3, 1979), an eight-strikeout, no walk complete game win (10–1) vs. the Baltimore Orioles (July 7, 1979), a ten-inning, four-hit complete game win (2–1) vs. the Minnesota Twins (April 16, 1980), holding All-Stars Sal Bando, Buddy Bell, Mike Hargrove, Rickey Henderson, Roy Howell, Pat Kelly, Hal McRae, Willie Randolph, Jim Rice, and Roy Smalley to a .103 collective batting average (15-for-145), holding Hall of Famers Reggie Jackson, Cal Ripken Jr., and Robin Yount to a .167 collective batting average (3-for-18) and throwing the opening pitch at a Los Angeles Angels game on Monday, June 27, 2011.

See also
 Chicago White Sox all-time roster

References

External links

Dave Frost - Baseball Biography and Highlights

1952 births
Living people
Baseball players from Long Beach, California
California Angels players
Chicago White Sox players
Gulf Coast White Sox players
Hawaii Islanders players
Iowa Oaks players
Kansas City Royals players
Knoxville Sox players
Major League Baseball pitchers
Omaha Royals players
Portland Beavers players
Salt Lake City Gulls players
Stanford Cardinal baseball players
Anchorage Glacier Pilots players
Millikan High School alumni